Paweł Strąk (born March 24, 1983 in Ostrowiec Świętokrzyski) is a Polish footballer who last played for Zawisza Bydgoszcz.

Honours

with Zawisza Bydgoszcz
 Polish SuperCup Winner (2014)
 Polish Cup Winner (2013/14)
 I Liga Winner (2012/13)

with Wisła Kraków

 Ekstraklasa Winner (2002/03 and 2003/04)
 Polish Cup Winner (2002/03)

Career

Club
His former clubs include Wisła Kraków and Zagłębie Lubin.  In June 2008 he signed a two-year-contract with the Austrian club SV Ried. In December 2008 he signed with Górnik Zabrze.

National team
Strąk is a former U-21 Poland national football team member. In 2002, he was also called up to the senior national team for a game against Denmark but did not play.

External links
 

1983 births
Living people
Polish footballers
Wisła Kraków players
Zagłębie Lubin players
GKS Bełchatów players
SV Ried players
Hutnik Nowa Huta players
Górnik Zabrze players
Zawisza Bydgoszcz players
People from Ostrowiec Świętokrzyski
Sportspeople from Świętokrzyskie Voivodeship
Association football defenders